Tayasan, officially the Municipality of Tayasan,  is a 3rd class municipality in the province of Negros Oriental, Philippines. According to the 2020 census, it has a population of 38,159 people.

Geography

Barangays
Tayasan is politically subdivided into 28 barangays.

Climate

Demographics

Economy

Education

Public High Schools

Private High Schools

References

External links
 [ Philippine Standard Geographic Code]
Philippine Census Information
Local Governance Performance Management System

Municipalities of Negros Oriental